Main Street is a street in Hamilton, Ontario, Canada.

History

Main Street was originally called Court Street, after the first courthouse that stood on it. It is now called Main Street because it formed the "main" concession line of Barton Township.

On June 20, 1877, the first commercial telephone service in Canada began in Hamilton, Ontario. Hugh Cossart Baker, Jr. learned of Alexander Graham Bell's invention in 1877 at the Philadelphia International Exposition and from there decided to test the communication tool in Hamilton. Hugh Cossart Baker Jr. is credited with making the first telephone exchange in the British Empire from an office building (Exchange Building) at the corner of James and Main Street East which still stands there today (March 2007).

In 1925, The first traffic lights in Canada went into operation at the Delta. (11 June 1925).

McMaster University arrived in Hamilton in 1930 from Bloor Street in Toronto. The total student population at McMaster University is well over 27,000. Almost two-thirds of the students come from outside the immediate Hamilton region.

Built in 1931, Westdale Secondary School was immediately deemed the largest composite school in the British Empire, having cost $1.3 million to build and consisting of 4.7 hectares of building, grounds and athletic fields.

Landmarks
Crystal Palace Site
Wentworth County Court House Site

Note: Listing of Landmarks from West to East.
White Chapel Cemetery
CNIB building
Canadian Martyrs Elementary School
McMaster University
Scottish Rite Castle/ Masonic Centre, Originally the home of George Elias Tuckett, (1835-1900), Tuckett Tobacco Company owner + Hamilton's 27th Mayor in 1896. (just South of Main Street on Queen Street South
Hess Village
Bay 200, residential apartment building (Hamilton's 10th-tallest building, just South of Main Street West)
Hamilton-Wentworth District School Board Building
New Hamilton City Hall
Irving Zucker Sculpture Court
MacNab Street Presbyterian Church
Hamilton Street Railway
Hamilton Public Library
Canadian Football Hall of Fame Museum
Bank of Montreal Building (Hamilton) (converted to a National Law firm office)
Landed Banking and Loan Company building
Exchange Building (site of the first telephone exchange in the British Empire)
John Sopinka Courthouse
Hamilton Courthouse
Landmark Place (Hamilton's tallest building)
First Place Hamilton
Don Cherry's Grapevine site
St. Patrick Church
St. Patrick Elementary School
Cathedral Secondary School
Columbia Elementary School
Gage Park
Hamilton Children's Museum (inside Gage Park)
Gage Park Bandshell (concert stage)
Gage Park fountain
Memorial Elementary School
Ottawa Street Shopping District - "Textile District"
Delta Secondary School
Montgomery Park
Burlington Synchronized Swimming Club
Queenston Traffic Circle (Queenston Road branches off from this point)
Sir Winston Churchill Park
Sir Winston Churchill Secondary School
Parkdale Park
Parkdale Arena
Roxborough Park

Communities

Note: Listing of neighbourhoods from West to East.
Ainslie Wood
Westdale
Strathcona/ Kirkendall North
Central/ Durand
Beasley/ Corktown
Landsdale/ Stinson
Gibson/ St. Clair
Stipley/ Blakeley
Crown Point West/ Delta West
Crown Point East/ Delta East
Homeside/ Bartonville
Normanhurst
McQuesten West

Gallery

References

MapArt Golden Horseshoe Atlas - Page 646/647/648 - Grids H5, J5, J6, J7, J8, H8, H9, H10, G10, G11, G12, G13, G14, G15, G16, G17, G18, G19

External links

Downtown Hamilton
Google Maps: Main Street (Hybrid)

Roads in Hamilton, Ontario